John Hoogenakker is an American stage, screen and commercial actor. On stage, he has been in a number of plays in the Chicago and Milwaukee area. He played the Bud Light King in Bud Light's Dilly Dilly television commercials. He played Lt. Spellman in Chicago Fire, Matice in Tom Clancy's Jack Ryan, Carl Wilkes in Castle Rock, and Randy Ramseyer in Dopesick.

Early life and education
Hoogenakker was born and raised in Charlotte, North Carolina. His first commercial was as a child for Pepsi/NASCAR. He attended South Mecklenburg High School. He was involved in choir, children's theatre, JROTC and the debate team. He got his Bachelor of Fine Arts in acting from DePaul University in Chicago in 1999.

Career

Stage work 
Hoogenakker's first professional role was in 1999 as Scarus in the Shakespeare play Antony and Cleopatra at the Chicago Shakespeare Theater. In 2000, he played Chris Smith in the Tracy Letts play Killer Joe when it was at The Theatre at 2851 N. Halsted Street; and the title character in the play Robyn Hood of Barnsdale Wood at the Equity Library Theatre. He was in the main cast for the Bomb-itty of Errors when it was performed in Chicago.

In 2002, he was involved in the Missouri Repertory Theatre and Arizona Theatre Company co-production Work Song: Three Views of Frank Lloyd Wright where he played one of Frank's sons. He joined the Milwaukee Repertory Theater, and debuted as Junior in Escape from Happiness.  He would later return in 2007 to do Translations. In the summer of 2004, for the Illinois Shakespeare Festival, he played Valentine in Two Gentlemen of Verona and Hamlet in Hamlet. Other Shakespeare appearances were with the Chicago Shakespeare Theater where he portrayed Paris in Romeo and Juliet (2005), Claudio in Much Ado About Nothing (2005–2006) and Rodrigo in Othello (2008).

At Writers Theatre, he had multiple roles in the ensemble plays The Puppetmaster of Lodz (2007) and Travels with My Aunt (2010–2011); as well as single roles Hamlet in Rosencrantz and Guildenstern Are Dead (2009), Dermot in Port Authority (2013), and George in Death of a Streetcar Named Virginia Woolf: A Parody (2016). the last of which was nominated for a Jeff Equity Award for Best Ensemble.

At Goodman Theatre, he had roles in Sarah Ruhl's Passion Play: A Cycle in Three Parts (2007), played Milan in Rock 'n' Roll (2009), Paul Moore in Tracey Scott Wilson's The Good Negro (2010), Trip Wyeth in Other Desert Cities (2013) and the Physic in Jordan Harrison's The Amateurs (2015).   In 2012, he played Willie Oban in the Goodman Theatre's revival of The Iceman Cometh, and would reprise his role in 2015 when the show was performed at the Brooklyn Academy of Music in New York City. In 2018, he played Scrooge for a limited engagement on the Q Brothers Christmas Carol, a rendition of A Christmas Carol, produced by the Chicago-based Q Brothers GQ and JQ. He had previously worked with GQ on The Bomb-itty of Errors.

Television and film work 
Hoogenakker's earliest role on national television was a doctor in the  series ER.  In 2011, he played district attorney Jeff Doyle towards the end of season 2 of Boss. He had a recurring role as Lt. Spellman in season 2 of Chicago Fire. On film, he had roles in Flags of Our Fathers and Public Enemies.  He played Gustav in A Very Harold & Kumar Christmas, Mr. Pritchard in At Any Price, and Guy in Animals.

In August 2017, Hoogenakker played the Bud Light King in "Banquet", a medieval-themed beer commercial wherein his lines introduced the popular catchphrase, "Dilly Dilly". He said that he auditioned for the commercial role via video teleconference. The campaign was very popular and resulted in multiple commercials and appearances during Super Bowls and other major sports events over the next few years.

In 2018, Hoogenakker got a recurring role as Scott Garland in season 3 of Colony. He joined the cast of the Amazon TV series Tom Clancy's Jack Ryan as CIA operator Matice, who was a recurring character in season 1 and a main character in season 2. In 2019, he played Carl Wilkes in season 2 of Castle Rock.

In 2021, he joined the main cast of the Hulu mini-series Dopesick, based on the nonfiction book Dopesick: Dealers, Doctors and the Drug Company that Addicted America by Beth Macy. He portrayed Assistant U.S. Attorney Randy Ramseyer, who was a real person. He auditioned via Zoom, and helped director Avy Kaufman do read-throughs as they were auditioning other actors; Kaufman said "was so good in the read-through, it was like, we got to give him a great part in the series." Dopesick has garnered a number of awards and nominations.

He played John in the 2021 short film I Can Change which was written and directed by Jim Jenkins, the same director for the Bud Light ads  In the film, his character is "an underachiever who receives the power to stop time the night before his wedding". Jenkins said, "Having worked with John many times, I always tell him he has a unique ability to play both the smartest person and the dumbest person in the scene at the same time." The film premiered at Tribeca Festival in 2021.

He starred in a TV commercial for the Chevy Silverado that aired during the Summer Olympics in 2021. In the ad, also directed by Jenkins, he plays the owner of a cat (Walter the Cat) who does things people would expect of a dog. Another ad reprising the two aired at the end of January and during the 2022 Winter Olympics.

In 2023, he is slated to appear in the upcoming mini-series American Tragedies: Waco - The Trials, a sequel to Waco which aired in 2018 on Paramount Network. He is also appearing in the upcoming thriller film Knox Goes Away, which is directed by his Dopesick co-star Michael Keaton.

Personal life 
Hoogenakker is married and has two children.

Stage credits

Filmography

Film

Television

Video games

References

External links 
 
 

Actors from Chicago
Actors from Charlotte, North Carolina
Year of birth missing (living people)
Living people
American male Shakespearean actors
American male stage actors
American male television actors